Mordialloc railway station is located on the Frankston line in Victoria, Australia. It serves the south-eastern Melbourne suburb of Mordialloc, and it opened on 19 December 1881.

Stabling facilities are located at the Frankston (Down) end of the station, whilst a third track is located through the middle of station, normally only used by Qube's Long Island steel freight train, and trains shunting into the yard. A pedestrian underpass is located at the Up end of the station.

History

Mordialloc station opened on 19 December 1881, when the railway line from Caulfield was extended. It remained a terminus until 1 August 1882, when the line was extended to Frankston. Like the suburb itself, the station gets it name from an Indigenous word meaning 'near little sea', or from either a creek named Moodi or Marida.

The Mordialloc station precinct has a number of heritage buildings and elements, including the cottage style historic station buildings (1882 and 1887), and the last remaining example of an Edwardian railway water tower (1910) in Victoria, also known as a "Type H" water tower.

In 1979, a new bridge was provided over the Mordialloc Creek, located nearby in the Down direction of the station. In 1981, the goods yard was closed to traffic, and No.4 road was abolished and baulked. By 1984, the overhead lines for No.4 road and the goods sidings were removed.

In 1987, boom barriers were provided at both the McDonald Street and Bear Street level crossings, located in the Up and Down directions of the station respectively. In June 1988, the former signal box, which was located at the Down end of the station, was demolished, with the signal panel relocated to the main station building on Platform 1.

On 5 December 1995, Mordialloc was upgraded to a Premium Station.

On 9 September 2013, whilst travelling through the McDonald Street level crossing, a wagon on the Long Island steel train derailed, causing lengthy delays. In October 2015, new accessible toilets were provided at the station.

On 7 October 2021, the signal panel was abolished, with control transferred to the Kananook Signal Control Centre.

Announced in October 2022, Mordialloc will be elevated to remove 7 level crossings on the line. Further details, designs and a construction timeline will be released closer to the opening of the rebuilt station in 2029.

Platforms and services

Mordialloc has two side platforms. It is serviced by Metro Trains' Frankston line services. A number of services terminate at Mordialloc and stable in the sidings south of the station.

Platform 1:
  all stations and limited express services to Flinders Street, Werribee and Williamstown

Platform 2:
  all stations services to Frankston

Transport links

Kinetic Melbourne operates one SmartBus route via Mordialloc station, under contract to Public Transport Victoria:
  : Altona station – Mordialloc

Ventura Bus Lines operates four routes via Mordialloc station, under contract to Public Transport Victoria:
 : to Springvale station (peak-hour only)
 : Mordialloc – Chelsea station (off-peak only)
 : Hampton station – Carrum station
 : to Noble Park station

Gallery

References

External links

 Melway map at street-directory.com.au

Premium Melbourne railway stations
Railway stations in Melbourne
Railway stations in Australia opened in 1881
Railway stations in the City of Kingston (Victoria)